Gérard Casimir Ubaghs (a/k/a Gerhard Casimir Ubaghs) (November 26, 1800 – February 15, 1875) - Dutch Catholic philosopher and theologian. For about 30 years (1834–1864) he was the chief formulator and promoter of a type of philosophical theology known as "traditionalist ontologism." Many of Ubaghs' doctrines were modifications of forms of traditionalism and ontologism that were already current in the 19th- and previous centuries. Ubaghs and some of his followers taught primarily at the Catholic University of Louvain, where a school of philosophical theology based on his teachings came into being. This school of philosophical theology is referred to, variously, as the Traditionalist Ontologism of Louvain, or as the Ontologico-Traditionalist School of Louvain.

Family background
Ubaghs was born in Berg en Terblijt, a village in the municipality of Valkenburg aan de Geul, in Limburg (Netherlands). His parents were Jean Ubachs (1758 – April 30, 1833), who was an innkeeper on the Cauberg, and Marie Helene Pluijmen (1763 – November 6, 1840). Gerard's father spelled his surname "Ubachs" instead of "Ubaghs", as did many other members of the Ubaghs/Ubachs family. Jean and Marie were married on November 16, 1783 in Valkenburg, and they had 10 children. Gérard had 4 brothers and 5 sisters.

Ubaghs' career, and his followers and opponents
In 1834, while professor of philosophy at the seminary of Rolduc, Ubaghs was called to the Catholic University of Louvain. During the period 1834–1864, the Catholic University of Louvain was famous for being the primary dissemination point of traditionalist ontologism. Ubaghs held the position of Ordinary Professor and Dean of the Faculty of Philosophy and Letters, teaching a general introduction to philosophy, as well as logic, metaphysics and psychological anthropology.

In 1846, Ubaghs undertook the editorship of the Revue catholique (founded in 1843), which had become the official organ of ontologism. He was joined in this endeavor by Arnold-Pieter Tits (1807–1851) and Gérard Lonay (1806–1883). Tits had taught beside Ubaghs in the Seminary of Rolduc, and then transferred to Louvain in 1840, where he became professor of fundamental theology. Lonay had also been a professor at Rolduc before transferring to Louvain. 

Additional followers of Ubaghs included Nicholas-Joseph Laforêt (1823–1872), Pieter Claessens (1817–1886) (Canon of St. Rumbold's Cathedral in Mechlin), Jacques-Nicolas Moeller (1777–1862), Abbé Thomas-Joseph Bouquillon (1840–1902), and Bernard Van Loo, OFMRec (1818–1885). 

Ubaghs had several followers in France, the most prominent of whom were Louis Branchereau SS (1819–1913), Philippe Jerôme Marie Jules Fabre d'Envieu (1821–1901), and Flavien-Abel-Antoine Hugonin (1823–1898) (Bishop of Bayeux and Lisieux). 

But opponents of Ubaghs soon appeared. The Journal historique et littéraire founded by Pierre Kersten (1789–1865), kept up an incessant controversy with the Revue catholique. Opponents of Ubaghs' traditionalist ontologism who joined Kersten included Bonaventure Joseph Gilson (1796–1884) (dean of Bouillon), Jean-Joseph Lupus (1810–1888), and others. From 1858 to 1861 the controversy raged. It was at its height when a decision of the Roman Congregation (Sept. 21, 1864) censured in Ubaghs's works a series of propositions relating to ontologism. Already in 1843 the Congregation of the Index had taken note of five propositions and ordered Ubaghs to correct them and expunge them from his teaching, but he misunderstood the import of this first decision. When his career was ended in 1864 he had the mortification of witnessing the ruin of a teaching to which he had devoted forty years of his life.

From 1864 until his death in Louvain in 1875, Ubaghs lived in retirement.

Main doctrines of the traditionalist ontologism of Ubaghs
The theories of Ubaghs are contained in a vast collection of treatises on which he expended the best years of his life. Editions followed one another as the range of his teaching widened. Ubaghs clearly affirmed the fundamental thesis of Traditionalism: the acquisition of metaphysical and moral truths is inexplicable without a primitive Divine teaching and its oral transmission. Social teaching is a natural law, a condition so necessary that without a miracle man could not, except through it, attain the explicit knowledge of truths of a metaphysical and a moral order. Teaching and language are not merely a psychological medium which favours the acquisition of these truths; their action is determinant. Hence the primordial act of man is an act of faith; the authority of others becomes the basis of certitude. The question arises: Is our adherence to the fundamental truths of the speculative and moral order blind; and, is the existence of God, which is one of them, impossible of rational demonstration? Ubaghs did not go as far as this; his Traditionalism was mitigated, a semi-Traditionalism; once teaching has awakened ideas in us and transmitted the maxims (ordo acquisitionis) reason is able and apt to comprehend them. Though powerless to discover them it is regarded as being capable of demonstrating them once they have been made known to it. One of his favourite comparisons admirably states the problem: "As the word 'view' chiefly expresses four things, the faculty of seeing, the act of seeing, the object seen, e.g. a landscape, and the drawing an artist makes of this object, so we give the name idea, which is derived from the former, chiefly to four different things: the faculty of knowing rationally, the act of rational knowledge, the object of this knowledge, the intellectual copy or formula which we make of this object in conceiving it" (Psychologie, 5th ed., 1857, 41–42). Now, the objective idea, or object-idea (third acceptation), in other words, the intelligible which we contemplate, and contact with which produces within us the intellectual formula (notion), is "something Divine" or, rather, it is God himself. This is the core of ontologism. The intelligence contemplates God directly and beholds in Him the truths or "objective ideas" of which our knowledge is a weak reflection. Assuredly, if Ubaghs is right, skepticism is definitively overcome. Likewise if teaching plays in the physical life the part he assigns to it, the same is true of every doctrine which asserts the original independence of reason and which Ubaghs calls rationalism. But this so-called triumph was purchased at the cost of many errors. It is, to say the least, strange that on the one hand Traditionalist Ontologism is based on a distrust of reason, and on the other hand it endows reason with unjustifiable prerogatives. Surely it is an incredible audacity to set man face to face with the Divine essence and to attribute to his weak mind the immediate perception of the eternal and immutable verities.

Works
Logicae seu philosophiae rationalis elementa (6 editions, 1834–60)
Ontologiae sive metaph. generalis specimen (5 editions, 1835–63)
Theodicae seu theologiae naturalis (4 editions)
Anthropoligicae philosoph. elementa (1848)
Précis de logique élémentaire (5 editions)
Précis d'anthropol. psychologique (5 editions)
Du réalisme en théologie et en philosophie (1856)
Essai d'idéologie ontologique (1860)
numerous articles in the Louvain "Revue catholique''

Notes

External links
 

Flemish philosophers
1800 births
1875 deaths
Canons (priests)
People from Limburg (Belgium)